Hakenfelde is a German locality (Ortsteil) of Berlin in the borough (Bezirk) of Spandau.

History
The name Hakenfelde is derived a dairy-farm built in 1730 on the outskirts of Spandau. Part of the town of Spandau it merged into Berlin in 1920 with the "Greater Berlin Act". Due to its position at the borders of West Berlin within East Germany it was largely crossed, from 1961 to 1989, by the Berlin Wall. In 2003 it became an autonomous Ortsteil, separated (with Falkenhagener Feld and Wilhelmstadt) from the one of Spandau.

Geography

Overview
Located in the northeastern suburb of the city, Hakenfelde is surrounded by the Spandauer Forest and separated from the district of Reinickendorf by the river Havel. It borders with the Brandenburger municipalities of Falkensee, Schönwalde-Glien and Hennigsdorf, all in the district of Havelland. The bordering Ortsteil are Falkenhagener Feld, Haselhorst, Spandau, Reinickendorf and Konradshöhe (both in Reinickendorf district).

On the Havel there is an island (Eiswerder) and 3 islets (Pionierinsel, Großer Wall and Kleiner Wall) belonging to Hakenfelde. Eiswerder, situated in the middle of the Lake Spandau (Spandauer See), is linked to Hakenfelde and Haselhorst by 2 bridges.

Subdivision
The locality counts 2 zones (Ortslagen):
Gartenstadt Waldsiedlung Hakenfelde
Wasserstadt Spandau

Photogallery

Transport
Hakenfelde is not served by railways, it is simply traversed by the industrial track of the Osthavelländische Eisenbahn and the abandoned Bötzowbahn. It is served by several lines of the bus network and by some private ferry lines.

References

External links

 Hakenfelde page on www.berlin.de

Localities of Berlin
Hakenfelde